"World Cup" is a song by American YouTuber and streamer IShowSpeed. It was released on November 4, 2022, through Warner Records, in honor of the 2022 FIFA World Cup. The song has gained viral attention with the music video having 64.2 million views and being number 11 on the Top 100 Music Videos United States playlist by YouTube Music Global Charts as of January 1, 2023. The song has been used in TikToks and YouTube Shorts.

Background 
IShowSpeed began his obsession with football after a fan donated to Speed asking who was his favorite football player, to which he replied, "Christo   Ronaldo, sewey!". Speed started playing FIFA during his livestream and slowly became his main persona which led to him being invited to the Sidemen 2022 Charity Match. Speed released "Ronaldo (Sewey)" prior to the world cup as a meme song using Ronaldo's famous "Siu" phrase. Speed released "World Cup" on November 4 in honor of the 2022 FIFA World Cup.

Credits and personnel 
Credits adapted from Tidal.

 IShowSpeed – production, songwriting, vocals
 WageeBeats – production, songwriting
 Joe Grasso – production

Charts

Release history

See also
 List of FIFA World Cup songs and anthems

References

2022 songs
2022 singles
Warner Records singles